Count of Atouguia (in Portuguese Conde de Atouguia) was a Portuguese title of nobility created by a royal decree, dated from 17 December 1448, by King Afonso V of Portugal, and granted to D. Álvaro Gonçalves de Ataíde.

This title became extinct due to the 11th Count involvement in the Távora affair. The plot was discovered, the count was executed and his House and estates were confiscated.

List of the Counts of Atouguia (1448)
D. Álvaro Gonçalves de Ataíde (c. 1390 -1452);
D. Martinho de Ataíde (c. 1415 - 1499), his son;
D. Luis de Ataíde (1516 - 1581), his great-grandson, 10th Viceroy of India;
D. João Gonçalves de Ataíde (c.1560 - ? ), his 2nd cousin;
D. Luís de Ataíde (c. 1570 - ? ), his son;
D. Jerónimo de Ataíde (c. 1610 - 1665), his son;
D. Manuel Luís de Ataíde (c. 1640 - ? ), his older son;
D. Luís Peregrino de Ataíde (c. 1662 - 1689), his younger brother;
D. Jerónimo de Ataíde (c. 1680 - 1720), his son;
D. Luís Peregrino de Ataíde (1700 - ? ), his son, 6th Viceroy of Brazil;
D. Jerónimo de Ataíde (1721 - 1759), his son.

Family Name
The family name associated with the Counts of Atouguia was Ataíde.

See also
List of Countships in Portugal

Bibliography
 Vila-Santa, Nuno, "A Casa de Atouguia, os Últimos Avis e o Império: Dinâmicas entrecruzadas na carreira de D. Luís de Ataíde (1516-1581)", PhD thesis, Lisbon, FCSH-UNL, 2013. 
 Vila-Santa, Nuno, “Uma linhagem, Duas Casas: em torno dos Ataídes e das origens das Casas da Atouguia e da Castanheira (Séculos XV-XVI)”, Fragmenta Historica, nº 4, 2016, pp. 13-45.

"Nobreza de Portugal e do Brasil" – Vol. II, pages 331/337. Published by Zairol Lda., Lisbon 1989.

External links
Genealogy of the Counts of Atouguia, in Portuguese

References

Atouguia
1448 establishments in Portugal
Portuguese noble families